Andoque (or Andoke) are an indigenous people in Colombia. They live along the Aduche tributary of the Japurá River.

Language and culture 
The Andoque language is a language isolate and is extinct in Peru. The culture values "sacred plants" and a ritual called "Yuruparí." The "Yuruparí" ritual concerns their transcendent vision of cosmology. The Yuruparí ritual makes men initiates "die" then be "reborn" as members of the tribe.

Religion and oral history 
The various bee species originated from the nasal bone of Heron-of-the-Center when he was consumed by fire while wearing a jaguar-skin. Tapirs of various colors originated from "the star people, who are bees and wasps", when they ate the body of a honey-drinking old man, who "fell into a trap" which had been dug by his own son.

Notes

References
Fabio Jara : "Bees and Wasps : Ethno-Entomological Notions and Myths among the Andoke of the Caquetá River". In :- LATIN AMERICAN INDIAN LITERATURES JOURNAL, Vol. 11 (1995)

Indigenous peoples in Colombia
Circum-Caribbean tribes
Witoto